This is a complete list of the railway stations served by Cercanías Madrid services.

Stations

References